The South of England Show is a county show held annually at its own showground in Ardingly, Sussex during June.

The show was founded in 1967 and is organised by the South of England Agricultural Society, which is patronised by Queen Elizabeth II.  The show attracts up to about 80,000 visitors every year.

Features
The show still contains its central agricultural theme, with livestock including dairy and beef cattle, sheep and pigs, with thousands of animals on display.  The show has grown from its agricultural roots to include a large equestrian contingent, including showjumping, showing and heavy horse displays.

The show also includes a large number of trade stands as well as a food hall, flower marquee and crafts.  The main arena at the showground hosts a variety of displays from all the disciplines on show, including equestrian, livestock and musical, as well as special display items such as motorcycle displays and a parade of foxhounds from the local fox hunts.

References

Agricultural shows in England
Festivals established in 1967
Events in West Sussex
June events
1967 establishments in England
Ardingly